Walter Roynon (by 1529 – 1564 or later), of Chichester, Sussex, was an English politician.

Roynon was a Member of Parliament for Chichester in November 1554.

References

Year of birth missing
1564 deaths
Year of death unknown
People from Chichester
English MPs 1554–1555